Poh Yi Feng is a retired Singaporean footballer who played as a midfielder for Warriors FC and Balestier Khalsa in the S League.

International career
Poh earned his first call up to the national team on 2012 for friendlies against Hong Kong and Malaysia. He made his first international debut for the Lions against Hong Kong in the 86th minute in a 1–0 away defeat.

Honours
Singapore Armed Forces FC
 S League: 2007

Balestier Khalsa
 Singapore Cup: 2014
 League Cup: 2013

References

External links 
 

Living people
1986 births
Singaporean footballers
Singapore international footballers
Association football midfielders
Warriors FC players
Balestier Khalsa FC players
Singapore Premier League players
Singaporean sportspeople of Chinese descent